The pedestrian and cycle bridge in Tremerje is a bridge on a new cycle route between Celje and Laško in Slovenia. The bridge, which crosses the Savinja, also provides access for pedestrians and cyclists from the Rifengozd area to the bus stop along the main road in Tremerje and to connect the two settlements.

Basic data 
The main steel structure was designed as a space truss structure consisting of two longitudinal circular hollow profiles at the top and the bottom.

Cycle route 
The cycling connection between Celje and Laško mostly runs along the left bank of the Savinja river, partly along existing local roads and public paths. In addition to the construction of a bridge for pedestrians and cyclists near Tremerje, the arrangements included the construction of a cycling path and pedestrian corridors, the construction of supporting structures, two rest areas and public lighting. The construction was financed by the Slovenian Infrastructure Agency.

Gallery

References 

Buildings and structures completed in 2019
Bridges in Slovenia
Footbridges
Bridges completed in 2019
Savinja
21st-century architecture in Slovenia